Reds Corner is an unincorporated town in Clark Township, Johnson County, Indiana.

References

Unincorporated communities in Johnson County, Indiana
Unincorporated communities in Indiana
Indianapolis metropolitan area